Kamar Mushani Pakka , is a Union Council of Mianwali District in the Punjab province of Pakistan. The Union Council is an administrative subdivision of Isakhel Tehsil.

References

Union councils of Mianwali District